Enon may refer to:

Places

United States

Enon, Kentucky
Enon, Moniteau County, Missouri
Enon, St. Charles County, Missouri
Enon, North Carolina
Enon, Ohio
Enon Valley, Pennsylvania
Enon, Virginia
Enon, West Virginia

Elsewhere
 Ænon, where John the Baptist baptised
 Enon, Nova Scotia, Canada
 Enon, South Africa
 Enon Chapel, a Baptist chapel which stood in London in the 19th century
 Enon Formation, a geological formation in South Africa

Other uses
 Enon (band), an American indie band
 Enon (robot), created by Fujitsu
 Enon, a 2013 novel by Paul Harding
 Enon Kawatani, Japanese musician
 Enon Gavin (born 1971)), Gaelic footballer from Ireland
 English National Opera North, now Opera North

See also